Glogova is a commune in Gorj County, Oltenia, Romania. It is composed of five villages: Cămuiești, Cleșnești, Glogova, Iormănești (the commune centre) and Olteanu.

References

Communes in Gorj County
Localities in Oltenia
Place names of Slavic origin in Romania